CADICA (Spanish: Confederación Atlética del Istmo Centroamericano; Central American Isthmus Athletic Confederation) is the regional confederation governing body of athletics for national governing bodies and multi-national federations within Central America.  

The organization was founded in 1964, shortly before the second Central American Championships in Athletics were held. The current president is Ing. Calixto Sierra from Honduras.

Championships 
CADICA organizes the following championships:

 Central American Senior Championships in Athletics (Campeonatos Centroamericanos Mayores)
 Central American Junior (Under-20) and Youth (Under-18) Championships (Campeonatos Centroamericanos Juvenil A y B)
 Central American Age Group (Under-16 and Under-14) Championships (Campeonatos Centroamericanos Juvenil C y Infantil A)
Central American Cross Country Championships (Campeonatos Centroamericanos de Campo Traviesa)
Central American Race Walking Championships (Campeonatos Centroamericanos de Marcha), formerly: Central American Race Walking Cup (Copa Centroamericana de Marcha)

Member federations 
CADICA consists of 7 member federations. 6 of them are members of NACAC, while Panamá is member of CONSUDATLE.  Moreover, all 7 are also members of CACAC.

See also
Association of Panamerican Athletics (APA)
North American, Central American and Caribbean Athletic Association (NACAC)
South American Athletics Confederation (CONSUDATLE)
Central American and Caribbean Athletic Confederation (CACAC)

References

External links 
CADICA official website 
CADICA former website 

Athletics organizations
Ath
Ath
Sports organizations established in 1964